Love Is Blind: Brazil (Portuguese: Casamento às Cegas: Brasil; Literally: Blind Wedding: Brazil) is a Brazilian dating reality television series hosted by the Brazilian celebrity couple Camila Queiroz and Klebber Toledo which premiered on Netflix on October 6, 2021, as part of a three-week event.

Following the format of the American television series Love Is Blind, a group of men and women meet on the show with the hopes of finding a partner in marriage.

Netflix renewed Love Is Blind: Brazil for a second season on November 23, 2021, which premiered on December 28, 2022.

On January 11, 2023, it was revealed that a third season of Love Is Blind: Brazil was filmed in secret back-to-back with the second season and is set to be release by Netflix in the third or fourth quarter of 2023.

Format 
The series follows 32 men and women hoping to find love. For 10 days in a speed-dating format, the men and women date each other in different "pods" where they can talk to each other but not see each other. Whenever they decide, the individuals may propose to the contestant they wish to marry. After the proposal, and meeting face to face for the first time, the engaged couples head to a couples retreat. During this trip, they spend time getting to know their partners and meet the other couples participating in the experiment.

Following the couples retreat, they all move to the same apartment complex in São Paulo. While at the apartments, they all meet their partners' families and explore their partners' living conditions. On the day of the wedding, the engaged couples carry out wedding ceremonies and make their final decisions at the altar about whether to split up or get married, answering the question "Is love blind?"

Season overview

Season 1 (2021)

Season 2 (2022)

References

External links 
 

2021 Brazilian television series debuts
Brazilian reality television series
Portuguese-language Netflix original programming
Television series about marriage
Television shows filmed in Brazil
Television shows set in Brazil
Wedding television shows
Dating and relationship reality television series
Brazilian television series based on American television series